Robert Miller is a former professional American football player who played running back for six seasons for the Minnesota Vikings. Miller played high school football at Jack Yates High School from 1968 through 1971.

References

1953 births
Living people
American football running backs
Kansas Jayhawks football players
Minnesota Vikings players